Hernandia stenura is a species of plant in the Hernandiaceae family. It is found in Costa Rica, Nicaragua, and Panama.

References

Hernandiaceae
Near threatened plants
Flora of Costa Rica
Flora of Nicaragua
Flora of Panama
Taxonomy articles created by Polbot